Amatori Alghero is an Italian rugby union team based in Alghero, Sardinia. It currently plays in Serie B, the third division of the Italian league.

Notable former players
 Fangatapu Apikotoa 24 caps for Tonga (2 tries, 120 points)
 Gert Peens 23 caps for Italy (105 points)
 Juan Francesio 4 caps for Italy
 Benjamin de Jager 1 cap for Italy and Italy Sevens
 Steven Bortolussi Italy Sevens

External links
 Official site

Italian rugby union teams
Rugby clubs established in 1975
1975 establishments in Italy
Sport in Sardinia